The 14th Screen Awards also The Nokia 14th Annual Screen Awards ceremony, presented by Indian Express Group, honored the best Indian Hindi-language films of 2007. The ceremony was held on 10 January 2008 at Bandra Kurla Complex Ground, Mumbai. Hosted by Sajid Khan, it was telecasted on 27 January 2008 on StarPlus.

Taare Zameen Par led the ceremony with 16 nominations, followed by Guru and Life in a... Metro with 14 nominations each and Chak De! India with 12 nominations.

Taare Zameen Par won 7 awards, including Best Director and Best Supporting Actor (both for Aamir Khan), thus becoming the most-awarded film at the ceremony.

Awards
The winners and nominees have been listed below. Winners are listed first, highlighted in boldface, and indicated with a double dagger.

Main Awards

Technical Awards

Critics' Awards

Special awards

Superlatives

References

External links
 The Screen Awards (2008) at the Internet Movie Database

Screen Awards